National Tertiary Route 936, or just Route 936 (or ) is a National Road Route of Costa Rica, located in the Alajuela, Guanacaste provinces.

Description
In Alajuela province the route covers San Ramón canton (Peñas Blancas district), San Carlos canton (La Fortuna district).

In Guanacaste province the route covers Tilarán canton (Tronadora district).

References

Highways in Costa Rica